The Adventures of Mao on the Long March is Frederic Tuten's first published novel. The novel is a fictionalized account of Chairman Mao's rise to power, and is highly experimental in nature, including extensive use of parody and collage.

Plot summary

The novel has no linear plot, and is mostly composed of an elaborate arrangement of disparate elements. The novel presents a seemingly straightforward history of the Long March, as well as a fictionalized interview with Mao and several more conventional "novelistic" scenes with Mao as the main character.
The novel also includes a large selection of unattributed quotes from various sources and parodies of certain writers, including Faulkner, Hemingway, and Kerouac.

Publication history

The story first appeared in 1969 in a 39-page condensed form in the magazine Artist Slain. In 1970 the completed book was sent to various publishers and rejected as it was not considered a novel. Tuten considered self-publication and asked his friend Roy Lichtenstein to do the cover. Eventually, he was offered a publication deal by Citadel Press, on the condition that Lichtenstein make a lithograph of Mao for a deluxe edition (Lichtenstein's "Head of Mao" precedes Andy Warhol's Mao series by two years). The lithograph and book were published in an edition of 150 signed copies. However, the special edition was then disassembled by the publisher and very few of the original box editions remain intact. The novel was finally printed in 1971 and received a favorable review in The New York Times by Thomas Lask; this was followed by several other positive reviews and comments by writers, including Iris Murdoch and John Updike. In 1977 Marion Boyers reprinted the novel in England and the U.S., making sure to keep it in print as long as she was alive. The novel was re-released in 2005 by New Directions and is currently still in print.

Cover and layout
The cover of Mao features original artwork by painter Roy Lichtenstein, Tuten's close friend. It is a bold, smiling depiction of Mao, rendered in Lichtenstein's trademark benday dot style. Tuten himself was actually used as a model for the drawing, which Lichtenstein altered accordingly to resemble Mao.

The font used in the book intentionally resembles that of an informational pamphlet.

Quotations

I'm an old man who wants to dream the remaining days away. Yet I can't take a nice healthy crap without some fanatic bowing to the stool and singing: "Oh, our great Chairman Mao has again fertilized the world." What was all my hard work for, if I can't fill my last hours with serenity and nonproductive contemplation? 
 - Chairman Mao

Mao's wife sighs. "Come to bed, my sweet man; you need to dream."
"Not tonight. Tonight I would like to love you alone."
"Oh! Mao, the world is too tired for that."
"We must stir it to life then. The sexual act is a revolutionary act."
 - A conversation between Mao and his wife on the Long March.

Satire must never be directed against the class whose aspirations you share - only against the enemy. 
  Chairman Mao criticizing La Chinoise, a film by Jean-Luc Godard

Allusions/references to other works

The book is loaded with references to writers and literary texts, in the form of direct quotes, parodies, and allusions:

Quoted texts
 William Shakespeare – Anthony and Cleopatra
 Jack London – The Iron Heel, Martin Eden
 Nathaniel Hawthorne – The Marble Faun, The Blithedale Romance, Twice-Told Tales, Septimus Felton
 John William De Forest – Miss Ravenel's Conversion from Secession to Loyalty
 Herman Melville – "Roman Statuary"
 James Fenimore Cooper – The Bravo, The Pioneers
 Ralph Waldo Emerson – "The Transcendentalists"
 Washington Irving – The Adventures of Captain Bonneville
 Walter Pater – The Renaissance, Marius the Epicurean
 Oscar Wilde – De Profundis

Parodied Authors
 John Dos Passos
 William Faulkner
 Ernest Hemingway
 Jack Kerouac
 Bernard Malamud
 John Steinbeck

References to writers, artists, and filmmakers
In the fictional interview with Mao, over fifty books and publications, as well as several artists and filmmakers, are mentioned in passing. The following list includes only those who were discussed at length by Mao:
 Jean-Luc Godard - Made in U.S.A., La Chinoise, Vivre sa vie, Breathless
 Leon Trotsky - Literature and Revolution
 Kenneth Burke - Counter-Statement, Philosophy of Literary Form
 John Keats - "Ode on a Grecian Urn"
 Wallace Stevens
 Salvador Dalí

Literary significance & criticism

Earl Rovit describes the novel as: an artful pastiche of parody, surprising quotations, startling juxtaposition, teasing incongruity, and shrewd illumination of the knotted contradictoriness of the Western aesthetic tradition. Tuten makes subtle and productive use of the strategies of focus and composition which are traditionally the property of the visual arts.

According to Robert Detweiler, Tuten's handling of history as fantasy "enables the reader to grasp immediately the distortion of history and contrast it to the actual structure of past events." By transforming Mao into an insecure buffoon and the march into a mad and chaotic journey, the novel comically deflates the mythical status Mao had at the time.

Editions

 
 
 
 The novel has also been translated into French and Spanish.

Sources

John Updike's essay on the novel, "Satire without Serifs," originally appeared in the New Yorker. It was reprinted as an introduction in the 2005 New Direction edition, along with an introductory essay and postscript by Tuten himself.

Footnotes

References
"Twenty-Five Years After: The Adventures of Mao on the Long March." Essay by Frederic Tuten on Archipelago, 1997.

1971 American novels
Cultural depictions of Mao Zedong
Chinese Civil War
American historical novels
Novels set in China
1971 debut novels
Citadel Press books